Kildare Football Club was an English association football club from London.

History

The club was founded in 1877 as the works side of William Whiteley Limited, named after the Kildare Terrace home address of the company founder.  Its first recorded match was in October that year.

FA Cup entries

The club took part the FA Cup between 1879–80 and 1882–83, but lost in the first round each time; indeed the club only scored one goal, in a 1–1 draw with Acton in 1880-81.  Even that goal was controversial, as Acton appealed it for being offside.  As was normal for matches in the era, each side supplied an umpire, and they could not agree on the decision.  However, unlike in most matches, there was no referee to decide between them, so the decision was passed to the Football Association after the match, which ruled in favour of Kildare. Acton however won the replay 5–0.

Its last entry to the FA Cup was in 1883-84, but, after being paired with Clapham Rovers, who had defeated the club easily the year before, the club withdrew.

London Senior Cup

The club was a founder member of the London Football Association in 1882.  It entered the first London Senior Cup in 1882-83, but, after walking over Finchley in the first round, the club lost 6-1 at the Old Brightonians in the second.

The club's last appearance in the competition was a first round defeat at Streatham Common F.C the following season.

Possible revival

A Kildare club entered the London Senior Cup in 1890-91, winning through three qualifying rounds before losing to Old St Stephen's, and was a regular entrant until 1911-12, but it is not clear if this is the same club.

Colours

The club played in navy blue and amber shirts, white shorts, and navy blue stockings.  Until 1880 a navy blue cap was also part of the kit.

Ground

Originally the club played in Kensal Green, but in 1881 moved to Shepherd's Bush.

References

Association football clubs established in 1877
Defunct football clubs in England
1877 establishments in England
Association football clubs established in the 19th century